KXDD (104.1 FM) is a radio station  broadcasting a country music format. Licensed to Yakima, Washington, United States, the station serves the Yakima area.  The station is currently owned by David Stephens of Tulsa, Oklahoma.

KXDD has had the same country format for over 35 years. When they first signed on, they also played country music, as KAAR and KUTI-FM (co-owned with sister station 980 KUTI, now KTCR). But in 1977, the 104.1 frequency flipped to KUEZ, which had an Easy Listening format. Ironically, the KUEZ calls are currently on a 104.1 in Fallon, NV with a Soft Oldies format. In 1982 they adopted their current call sign, but it wasn't until around 1984 when country returned to 104.1 mHz.

On May 26, 2010, it was rumoured KXDD's parent company New Northwest Broadcasters's stations could possibly be sold in the near future. Principal of Revitalization Partners, Alan Davis says "The stations are on the air; it’s business as usual. I can only tell you there appears to be demand for the stations." In 2012, the stations were sold to James Ingstad.

References

External links

Country radio stations in the United States
XDD